Abbas Ahmad Atwi (born 12 September 1979) is a Lebanese former professional footballer who played as an attacking midfielder.

Making his debut for Lebanon in 2002, Atwi was the all-time most capped player for his country with over 80 international caps, before being surpassed by Hassan Maatouk in 2020; he played for the national team for over 13 years, until his final match in 2016.

Club career
Atwi grew up in the Zuqaq al-Blat quarter of Beirut; he began playing football in the streets aged six. He joined Nejmeh on 5 December 1997, and scored 114 goals in over 500 matches in his 10-year stay. In 2012, Atwi was sent on loan for a few months to Dubai Club in the United Arab Emirates. Atwi terminated his contract with Nejmeh on 18 January 2017, due to problems with the technical staff.

In summer 2017 Atwi joined Shabab Arabi, before moving to Shabab Sahel on 4 January 2018, scoring four goals and making five assists in his first season. On 17 July 2020, Atwi re-joined Nejmeh on a two-year deal.

On 2 September 2021, Atwi moved to Akhaa Ahli Aley on a free transfer; aged 42, he became the oldest Lebanese player to sign for another club. According to the International Federation of Football History & Statistics (IFFHS), Atwi was the fourth-oldest player (and oldest outfield player) to play a match in the top tier of a national championship in 2022, aged  in his last Lebanese Premier League game in 2022 against Sporting on 17 May. He left Akhaa in summer 2022.

International career
In 2002, Atwi played for the Lebanon Olympic team at the 2002 Asian Games, scoring a goal in an 11–0 win against Afghanistan. He made his senior debut for Lebanon in a match against Jordan in 2002. Atwi played in the 2006, 2010 and 2014 FIFA World Cup qualifiers. Atwi played his last international match in 2016.

Personal life 
Atwi is not related to fellow Lebanese footballer Abbas Ali Atwi, who is also known as Onika.

Career statistics

International
Scores and results list Lebanon's goal tally first.

Honours
Nejmeh
 Lebanese Premier League: 1999–2000, 2001–02, 2003–04, 2004–05, 2008–09, 2013–14
 Lebanese FA Cup: 2015–16; runner-up: 2020–21
 Lebanese Elite Cup: 1998, 2001, 2002, 2003, 2004, 2005, 2014, 2016, 2021
 Lebanese Super Cup: 2000, 2002, 2004, 2009, 2014, 2016; runner-up: 2021

Shabab Sahel
 Lebanese Elite Cup: 2019

Individual
 Lebanese Premier League Best Player: 2005–06, 2013–14
 Lebanese Premier League Team of the Season: 2001–02, 2005–06, 2006–07, 2009–10, 2013–14
 Lebanese Premier League Best Goal: 2006–07
 Lebanese Premier League top assist provider: 2006–07, 2010–11, 2012–13, 2013–14

See also
 List of Lebanon international footballers

References

External links

 
 Abbas Ahmad Atwi at RSSSF
 
 
 
 

1979 births
Living people
Lebanese footballers
People from Bint Jbeil District
Association football midfielders
Nejmeh SC players
Dubai CSC players
Al Shabab Al Arabi Club Beirut players
Shabab Al Sahel FC players
Akhaa Ahli Aley FC players
Lebanese Premier League players
UAE Pro League players
Lebanon youth international footballers
Lebanon international footballers
Asian Games competitors for Lebanon
Footballers at the 2002 Asian Games
Lebanese expatriate footballers
Lebanese expatriate sportspeople in the United Arab Emirates
Expatriate footballers in the United Arab Emirates